The Lodge at Chaa Creek is an eco-resort and 400-acre private nature reserve located in the Cayo District of Belize, Central America. Established as a small family farm in 1981, it has grown to be one of Belize’s most recognized resorts. It has also received international recognition as a model for sustainable tourism and responsible travel by Conde Nast, National Geographic Adventure, Travel and Leisure magazines, and other publications and organizations. Chaa Creek runs educational and natural history programs with a focus on Belize's Maya culture and civilization.

Early history and development

In the late 1970s, Mick and Lucy Fleming decided to make Belize their home and purchased a disused, overgrown citrus farm on the banks of the Macal River in the Cayo District of Western Belize. As there was no road access into the property at that time, travel to and from San Ignacio, the closest town, was by river, using a dugout canoe as their neighbours had for centuries. The Flemings supported themselves by taking produce such as vegetables, milk, eggs, cheese, and yogurt into the Saturday markets in San Ignacio Town.

In 1981 they opened Chaa Creek Cottages, the first jungle lodge in Belize, with two thatched roofed cottages built from local materials. In 1983 the British Army Corps of Engineers built a road into Chaa Creek, which facilitated the construction of a dining room for the now six cottages.  Within two years another six cottages, gift shop, a water tower, and staff quarters were built. By 1988 there were 16 cottage rooms, and electrical generation allowed for luxuries such as ice and hot water. A landing for a growing fleet of canoes and other improvements were added.
All of the cottages were upgraded in 1990 and a new office was established in nearby San Ignacio Town. As the property expanded, trails were established throughout the growing nature reserve as horseback riding tours, mountain biking, and trekking were introduced.

By 1992 there were 26 members of staff in residence at Chaa Creek. Infrastructure was continually upgraded with new stables for the growing herd of horses. Chaa Creek also hosted teams of archaeologists researching on the property and nearby sites.

The Chaa Creek Natural History Centre and Blue Morpho Butterfly Breeding Centre were established at Chaa Creek in 1993. Both centres continue to raise awareness of the local environment and encourage scientific research while recording and displaying, for the public and students, the results of scientific investigation and artifacts found on the property.

By 1997 there were a total of 21 cottages including several luxury suites, and the next year electric lighting and fans were added to the rooms
In 1999, the Macal River Camp at Chaa Creek with ten bungalow style casitas, and a central dining/social area was renovated.
In 2003 Chaa Creek acquired the adjacent Ixchel Medicine Trail (now known as the Maya Medicinal Plant Trail), which was established to investigate and perpetuate traditional Maya healing practices and medicinal plants. The Maya Organic Farm, which showcases traditional Maya agricultural practices and also supplies fresh vegetables for the resort, was also established. Along with the many Maya archaeological sites and temples on Chaa Creek and the Natural History Centre, they contribute to visitors’ understanding and appreciation of the Maya habitation of Belize.  
Chaa Creek currently consists of 28 cottages, suites, and villas and employs over 150 staff.

Ecological awareness and sustainable development

The Flemings had always maintained an interest in sustainable development and have said that Chaa Creek was operating as an eco-resort before they had even heard the term. As most of their neighbors were subsistence farmers using centuries old traditional farming and construction methods, they sought to learn what they could about traditional methods while investigating newer technologies and methods such as permaculture, intensive farming, solar power, and waste recycling.

As the resort grew and the Flemings were able to purchase land adjacent to theirs, they created a private nature reserve intended to provide a safe habitat for the many native species of flora and fauna of western Belize. At the resort and Macal River Camp, careful attention was paid to sustainable development and waste management, with innovations such as crushing glass bottles for use as aggregate in construction projects, solar electrical generation, maximized recycling, organic farming to supply the Lodge, and other innovations.

Chaa Creek also sponsored several environmental investigations and initiatives, including the US based RiverKeepers’ investigation of the impact of further dam construction on the Macal River, which included a visit by Robert F. Kennedy Jr., the establishment of the Belize Foundation for Conservation and the Bay Palm Reforestation project. Chaa Creek has also entered into partnerships with the Yerkes Primate Institute and the Foundation for Wildlife Conservation (Howler Monkey Reintroduction program), the New York Botanical Gardens (Agroforestry Research and Vascular Plant Cataloguing projects), the Zoological Society of Milwaukee County’s international Birds Without Borders organisation and other groups and peak bodies.

Focus on the Maya

The Chaa Creek area has been continually occupied by the Maya for at least 2500 years and was an important trade and habitation area. The well-known Maya sites of Cahal Pech and the Temple of Xunantunich are nearby, and over 70 Maya sites have been recorded on the 365 acre nature reserve.
In the course of farming and later development activities, many Maya artifacts, dwelling, storage, administrative and temple sites were uncovered at Chaa Creek, leading the owners to develop a keen interest in the local Maya history and culture. This led to sponsoring studies such as ongoing archaeology research by the University of California, Dr. Jaime Awe of the Belize Ministry of Archaeology, and other institutions and groups.

In the lead up to and during the winter solstice of 2012, the end of the Maya Long Count and an important historical epoch for the Maya, Chaa Creek is sponsoring a range of seminars, lectures, workshops, and cultural activities to further credible Maya research and dispel popular myths surrounding that year and Maya interpretations of its significance.

Environmental education

In addition to educating visitors, the Chaa Creek Natural History Centre and Nature Reserve hosts field trips for many local and international schools, colleges, and universities each year.

The Environmental Education Outreach is a school-based environmental education program Chaa Creek runs in Belize.  An ongoing partnership with the State University of New York to annually produce and host a five-day Summer Teachers Institute in Environmental Studies and Culture teachers training program promotes the sustainable use of natural resources while promoting an understanding of Belize’s cultural heritage.  The Bush Medicine Camp in partnership with the Ixchel Tropical Research Foundation is an annual youth camp that focuses on Belize Maya medicinal plants and their traditional uses.

Chaa Creek also hosts local and international student interns to gain work experience and other research projects.

References

Cayo District
Ecotourism
Resorts in Belize